Bethany is an unincorporated community in Caddo Parish, Louisiana and Panola County, Texas in the United States, on U.S. Route 79. The Caddo Parrish portion of the community is part of the Shreveport – Bossier City metropolitan area.

History
Bethany was founded in 1840. It was named after the Bethany Church.

Geography
The northern part of Bethany is located in Caddo Parish.

See also

References

Unincorporated communities in Texas
Unincorporated communities in Louisiana
Populated places established in 1840
Unincorporated communities in Panola County, Texas
Unincorporated communities in Caddo Parish, Louisiana
Populated places in Ark-La-Tex
Unincorporated communities in Shreveport – Bossier City metropolitan area